Cologne I is an electoral constituency (German: Wahlkreis) represented in the Bundestag. It elects one member via first-past-the-post voting. Under the current constituency numbering system, it is designated as constituency 93. It is located in western North Rhine-Westphalia, comprising the southeastern part of the city of Cologne.

Cologne I was created for the inaugural 1949 federal election. Since 2021, it has been represented by Sanae Abdi of the Social Democratic Party (SPD).

Geography
Cologne I is located in western North Rhine-Westphalia. As of the 2021 federal election, it comprises the southeastern part of the independent city of Cologne, specifically the districts of Porz, Kalk, and the Stadtteile of Altstadt-Nord, Deutz, and Neustadt-Nord from Innenstadt.

History
Cologne I was created in 1949. In the 1949 election, it was North Rhine-Westphalia constituency 7 in the numbering system. From 1953 through 1961, it was number 66. From 1965 through 1998, it was number 59. From 2002 through 2009, it was number 94. Since the 2013 election, it has been number 93.

Originally, the constituency comprised the area of Cologne on the left bank of the Rhine and north of the line made by Aachener Straße and Innere Kanalstraße. In the 1965 through 1976 elections, it comprised today's Innenstadt district as well as Kalk, Humboldt-Gremberg, and Poll. In the 1980 through 1998 elections, it comprised Innenstadt and Porz. It acquired its current borders in the 2002 election.

Members
The constituency was first represented by Aenne Brauksiepe of the Christian Democratic Union (CDU) from 1949 to 1965. It was won by the Social Democratic Party (SPD)'s candidate Hans-Jürgen Wischnewski in 1965. The SPD held the constituency until 2017. Wischnewski represented it until 1990, when he was succeeded by Walter Rempe, who served a single term. Volkmar Schultz was elected in 1994 and served until 2002, followed by Martin Dörmann. Karsten Möring of the CDU was elected in 2017. Sanae Abdi regained the constituency for the SPD in 2021.

Election results

2021 election

2017 election

2013 election

2009 election

References

Federal electoral districts in North Rhine-Westphalia
Politics of Cologne
Constituencies established in 1949
1949 establishments in West Germany